Zu-ye Sofla may refer to:
 Shirabad, Maneh and Samalqan, North Khorasan
 Shahr-e Zow, Razavi Khorasan